

Overview 
SmeT is a transcriptional repressor protein of 24.6 kDa found in the pathogen bacteria Stenotrophomonas maltophilia. It is responsible for the regulation of the Multidrug Resistance system (MDR) SmeDEF and can increase or decrease the resistance of the bacteria to several antibiotics such as tetracycline, chloramphenicol, quinolones or erythromycin through binding to a specific region of the bacterial chromosome. Structurally SmeT forms 9 helices:α1, α2 and α3  are responsible for the DNA binding, α4, α5, α6 and α7 form the effector binding pocket and α8  and α9 allow the dimerization of the protein. SmeT is a member of the TetR family of Tetracycline repressors and its mechanism of repression is based in the binding of two dimmers to its cognate DNA.

Structure

Mechanism

Related Proteins and Family

Applications

References 

Bacterial proteins
Antibiotics